Zakhar Romanovich Bardakov (born 24 February 2001) is a Russian professional ice hockey winger who currently plays for SKA Saint Petersburg of the Kontinental Hockey League.
He was selected in the seventh-round, 203rd overall, by the New Jersey Devils in the 2021 NHL Entry Draft.

Career statistics

Regular season and playoffs

International

References

External links

2002 births
Living people
New Jersey Devils draft picks
People from Seversk
Russian ice hockey left wingers
SKA Saint Petersburg players
SKA-Neva players
HC Vityaz players
Sportspeople from Tomsk Oblast